Belocephalus is a genus of short-winged coneheads in the family Tettigoniidae. Coneheads are a type of bush crickets or katydids. There are about eight described species in Belocephalus.

Species
These eight species belong to the genus Belocephalus:
 Belocephalus davisi Rehn & Hebard, 1916 i c g b (Davis's conehead)
 Belocephalus hebardi Davis, 1912 i c g
 Belocephalus hesperus Hebard, 1926 c g
 Belocephalus micanopy Davis, 1914 i c g
 Belocephalus sabalis Davis, 1912 i c g b (palmetto conehead)
 Belocephalus sleighti Davis, 1914 i c g
 Belocephalus subapterus Scudder, 1875 i c g
 Belocephalus uncinatus Hebard, 1927 i c g
Data sources: i = ITIS, c = Catalogue of Life, g = GBIF, b = Bugguide.net

References

Further reading

 
 

Taxonomy articles created by Polbot
Tettigoniidae